Conus natalis, common name the Natal textile cone, is a species of sea snail, a marine gastropod mollusk in the family Conidae, the cone snails and their allies.

Like all species within the genus Conus, these snails are predatory and venomous. They are capable of "stinging" humans, therefore live ones should be handled carefully or not at all.

Description
The size of the shell varies between 20 mm and 60 mm. The oblong shell is thin, smooth, angulated at the shoulderand sulcate below. It is roseate, minutely angularly lineate with brown, and bifasciate with large maculations. The spire is maculate.

Distribution
This marine species occurs off the east coast of South Africa and off Mozambique.

References

 Tucker J.K. & Tenorio M.J. (2013) Illustrated catalog of the living cone shells. 517 pp. Wellington, Florida: MdM Publishing.
 Puillandre N., Duda T.F., Meyer C., Olivera B.M. & Bouchet P. (2015). One, four or 100 genera? A new classification of the cone snails. Journal of Molluscan Studies. 81: 1–23

External links
 The Conus Biodiversity website
 Cone Shells - Knights of the Sea
 
 

natalis
Gastropods described in 1858